Mikhail Konstantinovich Diterikhs (May 17, 1874 – September 9, 1937) served as a general in the Imperial Russian Army and subsequently became a key figure in the monarchist White movement in Siberia and the Russian Far East area during the Russian Civil War of 1917–1923.

Descended from Lutheran  Sudeten German ancestors who became Baltic Germans, Diterikhs had a reputation as "a deeply religious man, the walls of whose private railway coach were plastered with icons"; he saw himself as "waging a holy war against the Bolshevik heathens".

Biography
Diterikhs was born to Konstantin Alexandrovich Diterikhs, who served as a general of the Russian Imperial Army in the Caucasus, and Olga Iosifovna Musintskaya, a Russian noblewoman. His family was of German Bohemian descent, his great-grandfather Johann Gottfried Dieterichs moved from Wolfenbüttel, in the Duchy of Brunswick-Lüneburg, to Waiwara in Estonia during the 18th century. In 1900, Diterikhs graduated from the Page Corps and was assigned a post in the Life Guards 2nd Artillery Brigade. In 1900, he graduated from the Nikolaevsky Military Academy in St. Petersburg. From 1900 to 1903 he served in various staff positions in the Moscow Military District. In 1903 he was appointed commander of the squadron in the 3rd Dragoon Regiment.

With the start of the Russo-Japanese War in 1904, Diterikhs became chief officer for special duties at the 17th Army Corps headquarters. He arrived at the front in Manchuria in August 1904, and participated in the Battles of Liaoyang, Shaho and Mukden. By the end of the war, he was a lieutenant. After the end of the war he returned to Moscow, and in 1906 was chief officer for special duties at the 7th Army Corps headquarters. The following year, he had the same position at the Kiev Military District headquarters. He was promoted to colonel in 1909. In 1910, he served as a senior aide at the Kiev Military District headquarters. From 1913, Diterikhs was head of the Mobilization Department of the Main Directorate of the General Staff.

With the start of World War I, Diterikhs was assigned as Chief of Staff for the Russian Third Army on the Southwestern Front under the command of General Aleksei Brusilov, with whom he assisted in planning the Brusilov Offensive in August 1916. In September of the same year, he commanded a Russian expeditionary force in Thessaloniki on the Macedonian front in support of the Serbian Army and fought the Bulgarian army and repelled them successfully in the monastir offensive.

After the February Revolution, Diterikhs was recalled to Russia. In August 1917 the Russian Provisional Government offered Diterikhs the position of Minister of War, which he refused. By November 3, 1917, Diterikhs was promoted to the chief of staff of the Russian army's headquarters, but managed to escape arrest during the Bolshevik revolution. Diterikhs escaped to Kiev, then made his way to Siberia where the Czechoslovak Legions asked him to become their chief of staff and the commander of the fives T. G. Masaryk's rifle regiment too.  He helped the Czech Legion to organize their first resistance in May 1918, and commanded their Irkutsk-Chita-Vladivostok armed group.

Diterikhs was ordered by Admiral Kolchak to arrest the Ufa directory but delayed his move. After a few days on November 26, 1918, he finally agreed to obey to Kolchak's order and simultaneously resigned from the Czech Legion after a period of tense relations.

From January to July 1919 Diterikhs personally supervised the Sokolov investigation of the murder of Tsar Nicholas II. Later he published a book on this subject, when he already lived abroad. Based on his anti-Semitic views, he tried to present the execution as a ritual murder organized by Jews.

In July 1919 Diterikhs took command of the Siberian Army of Admiral Kolchak. He assisted in creation of various paramilitary militias in support of the White movement and the Russian Orthodox Church against the Bolsheviks. In September 1919 he commanded Admiral Kolchak's last successful offensive against the Red Army, the Tobolsk Operation. However, in December 1919 he resigned after a bitter quarrel with Kolchak and emigrated to Harbin in Manchuria.

Periodically Diterikhs figured in the negotiations between the Provisional Priamurye Government and other White forces. On June 8, 1922, Diterikhs returned to take over the Army of Verzhbitski as well as the civil administration. Based in the Amur Krai, Diterikhs proceeded to reorganize the army and civil government, much in the way General Pyotr Wrangel had done in the Crimea two years earlier. Taking a hands-on approach, Diterikhs made efforts to enlist the support of the local population for his cause, calling his battle a religious crusade against Bolshevism. He had also tried, in vain, to convince the Japanese not to withdraw their military support.

Diterikhs founded the last Zemsky Sobor on Russian soil on July 23, 1922. On August 8, 1922, the sobor declared that the throne of Russia belonged to the House of Romanov in the person of Grand Duke Nikolai Nikolaevich Romanov. It also named Diterikhs as the ruler of the Provisional Priamur Government and its armed forces, called in archaic terms the Zemskaya Rat. On October 25, 1922, the Bolsheviks defeated Diterikhs's army, forcing an evacuation from Vladivostok to China and Korea via Japanese ships.

After May 1923 Diterikhs moved from a military refugee camp to Harbin where many White emigres settled. He became the head of the Far East chapter of the Russian All-Military Union organization. Diterikhs died in Shanghai in 1937, where he was buried.

Honors
 Order of St. Stanislaus 3rd degree, 1902
 Order of St. Anne 3rd degree with swords and bow, 1904 (Battle of Liaoyang)
 Order of St Vladimir, 4th degree with swords and bow, 1906
 Order of St. Stanislaus 2nd degree with swords, 1905 (Battle of Mukden)
 Order of St. Anne 2nd degree with swords, 1905
 Order of St. Stanislaus 1st degree with swords, 1915
 Order of White Eagle 2nd Class with Swords, 1916 (Serbia)
 Croix de Guerre, with palm branch, 1916 (France)
 Order of St Vladimir, 2nd degree with swords, 1917
 Legion of Honor, Officer Cross, 1917 (France)
 Order of the Falcon, Military Division with Swords, 1919 (Czechoslovakia)

Notes

References

 Biography in the Russian Biographical Dictionary

1874 births
1937 deaths
Military personnel from Saint Petersburg
People from Sankt-Peterburgsky Uyezd
People from the Russian Empire of German descent
Imperial Russian Army generals
Russian military personnel of the Russo-Japanese War
Russian military personnel of World War I
Russian Provisional Government generals
People of the Russian Civil War
White movement generals
White Russian emigrants to China
Russian All-Military Union members
Russian monarchists
Blood libel
Officiers of the Légion d'honneur
Recipients of the Order of Saint Stanislaus (Russian), 1st class
Recipients of the Order of St. Anna, 2nd class
Recipients of the Order of St. Vladimir, 2nd class
Recipients of the Croix de Guerre 1914–1918 (France)
People from the Russian Empire of Czech descent
Russian exiles
Russian anti-communists
Russian nobility